The Western Beskidian Foothills is a geological region in the northeastern corner of the Czech Republic and extending into southern Poland. The relatively modest foothills are considered part of the Outer Western Carpathians.

Subdivision
The Western Beskidian Foothills consists of four subranges (from west to east):  
 Moravian-Silesian Foothills (Czech: Podbeskydská pahorkatina, Polish: Pogórze Śląsko-Morawskie)
 Silesian Foothills (Polish: Pogórze Śląskie)
 Wieliczka Foothills (Polish: Pogórze Wielickie)
 Wiśnicz Foothills (Polish: Pogórze Wiśnickie)

See also
 Beskids
 Western Beskids
 Western Carpathians
 Outer Subcarpathian regions

Literature

Maps

Western Carpathians